The Crown is a Grade II listed pub in Houghton Regis, Bedfordshire, England.

It is a thatched pub built in the 17th century, and largely unaltered since being refitted in the 1930s. It is on the Regional Inventory of Historic Pub Interiors for East Anglia.

References

Grade II listed pubs in Bedfordshire
Listed buildings in Luton
Pubs in Bedfordshire